In Concert – Live at Sibelius Hall is a collaboration album by Finnish soprano Tarja Turunen with musicians Kalevi Kiviniemi, Marzi Nyman and Markku Khron record at the Sibelius Hall, Finland and released on 25 November 2011.

Information
First plans of creating a classical group came out in 2006, when Tarja, Kalevi, Marzi and Markku made a concert together for the first time. They continued to present some concerts through Finland until they decided to formalize the group, by naming it Harus. As Tarja explained:

"There is an old Finnish tradition when it comes to newborns – the baby is not to be named until the baptism ceremony, when he or she is presented to the family with the chosen name. A few years ago, in 2006, a new project was born and, following the same tradition, the time has come to baptize it, to make the presentations to the family and to give it a name – HARUS."

The first video of the album was released on 20 October, from the track You Would Have Loved This, but the official promotional video was released on 17 November, from the track Walking in the Air.

Track listing
Standard track listing

Charts performance

References

2009 albums
Tarja Turunen albums